The Matthews-Godt House is a historic house on the 248 Skyline Drive in North Little Rock, Arkansas.  Built in 1928, it is an unusual and early example of a split-level house, a style that did not become popular until the 1950s.  It is a frame structure finished in brick veneer, in the English Revival style.  It was built by developer Justin Matthews as part of his Edgemont development, and was designed by his company architect, Frank Carmean.

The house was listed on the National Register of Historic Places in 1992.

See also
National Register of Historic Places listings in Pulaski County, Arkansas

References

Houses on the National Register of Historic Places in Arkansas
Houses completed in 1929
Houses in North Little Rock, Arkansas
National Register of Historic Places in Pulaski County, Arkansas